Selymbria is a genus of cicadas in the family Cicadidae, found in the Neotropics. There are about six described species in Selymbria.

Selymbria is the only genus of the tribe Selymbriini.

Species
These six species belong to the genus Selymbria:
 Selymbria ahyetios Ramos and Wolda, 1985
 Selymbria danieleae Sanborn, 2011
 Selymbria pandora Distant, 1911
 Selymbria pluvialis Ramos and Wolda, 1985
 Selymbria stigmatica (Germar, 1834)
 Selymbria subolivacea (Stål, 1862)

References

Further reading

 
 
 
 
 
 

Tibicininae
Cicadidae genera